Samuel Melcher (1801–1856) was a noted American architect active in the first half of the 19th century.

Selected notable works
North Yarmouth and Freeport Baptist Meetinghouse, Yarmouth, Maine (1825 alteration)
Damariscotta Baptist Church, Damariscotta, Maine (1847)

References

1801 births
1856 deaths
19th-century American architects
Architects from Maine